The Little Hours is a 2017 American medieval black comedy film written and directed by Jeff Baena. The film is loosely based on the first and second stories of day three of ten of The Decameron, a collection of novellas by Giovanni Boccaccio, a 14th-century Italian writer. It stars an ensemble cast featuring Alison Brie, Dave Franco, Kate Micucci, Aubrey Plaza, John C. Reilly, and Molly Shannon.

Set in the 14th century, the film is told in an anachronistic style with contemporary dialogue and behavior. The plot jointly follows the lives of three nuns at a convent in the countryside who try to fornicate with a young gardener posing as a deaf-mute after he escapes from being punished by his lord for adultery with the man's wife. The film held its world premiere at the Sundance Film Festival on January 19, 2017, and was released on June 30, 2017, by Gunpowder & Sky. The film received positive reviews from critics, with praise for the cast's performances.

Plot
In the year 1347 in Garfagnana, Italy, a convent of nuns is led by Father Tommasso. The three nuns at the center of the story are: Alessandra, who wants a better life for herself but is held at the convent due to her father's support of the church; Ginevra, a gossip who is later revealed to be a Jewish lesbian; and Fernanda, a violent sadist. The three of them routinely assault the friendly gardener Lurco, who quits in disgust. Meanwhile, in Lunigiana, a young servant named Massetto is caught having sex with his master's wife. While on the run, he discovers Father Tommasso, who has gone to sell some embroidery but has instead gotten drunk and lost his possessions in the river. Massetto helps him return home and the two arrange to have Massetto work as a gardener while pretending to be a deaf-mute, in hopes that this will dissuade the nuns from giving him trouble.

Fernanda's friend Marta appears and encourages Alessandra and Ginevra to get drunk with the sacramental wine while explaining how being with a man is the greatest possible pleasure. Fernanda takes Ginevra back to her room, where they have sex. Massetto and Alessandra form a close bond, while Ginevra develops feelings for Fernanda.

Later, Fernanda kidnaps Massetto at knife-point and takes him into the forest, where she meets up with a coven of witches. She attempts to perform a fertility ritual with Massetto but is stopped by the arrival of Alessandra and Ginevra. Ginevra, under the hallucinogenic effects of belladonna, takes off her clothes and begins dancing and steals the convent's donkey. Massetto reveals that he is not a deaf-mute while trying to free himself. They return to the convent, and all of their secrets are revealed in the presence of the visiting Bishop Bartolomeo. Father Tommasso is sent away to become a monk after it is discovered that he and the Mother Superior are in love and have a secret relationship. Massetto is returned to his master and is held in a jail cell with the impending threat of torture and death until the three nuns (who have reconciled and formed an even stronger friendship) help him escape. While Alessandra, Massetto, Ginevra, and Fernanda run hand-in-hand back to the convent, the Mother Superior and Father Tommasso have met up in secret under the pretense that the Mother Superior has gone to retrieve the donkey. They hide as the nuns and Massetto run by. Fernanda stops and stares in puzzlement at the once again freed donkey that she herself used as an excuse so many times to escape the convent, until Ginevra pulls her away. With the group gone, Father Tommasso and Mother Superior embrace and smile at each other.

Cast

 Alison Brie as Sister Alessandra 
 Dave Franco as Massetto
 Kate Micucci as Sister Ginevra
 Aubrey Plaza as Sister Fernanda 
 John C. Reilly as Father Tommasso
 Molly Shannon as Mother Marea
 Fred Armisen as Bishop Bartolomeo
 Jemima Kirke as Marta
 Nick Offerman as Lord Bruno
 Lauren Weedman as Francesca
 Paul Reiser as Ilario
 Adam Pally as Guard Paolo
 Paul Weitz as Lurco
 Jon Gabrus as Guard Gregorio

Production
In April 2016, it was announced that Jeff Baena had written and would direct a film starring Alison Brie, Dave Franco, Kate Micucci, Aubrey Plaza, John C. Reilly, Molly Shannon, Fred Armisen, Jon Gabrus, Jemima Kirke, Nick Offerman, Adam Pally, Paul Reiser, Lauren Weedman, and Paul Weitz. It was also announced that Liz Destro of Destro Films would be producing the film, with StarStream Media and Bow and Arrow Entertainment executive producing along with Productivity Media, and Exhibit Entertainment and Foton Pictures. Dan Romer composed the film's score. The screenplay is based on the first and second tales of the third day in The Decameron, a collection of novellas by Giovanni Boccaccio; however, the dialogue was improvised. The sets were accurate to the medieval period, but the behavior and language are contemporary. Filming locations included towns in the Tuscan province of Lucca: Castiglione di Garfagnana, Castelnuovo di Garfagnana, Pieve Fosciana, and Camporgiano. The castle scene was filmed in Fosdinovo, Province of Massa Carrara.

Release
The film had its world premiere at the Sundance Film Festival on January 19, 2017. Shortly after, Gunpowder & Sky acquired distribution rights to the film. It was released on June 30, 2017.

Reception

Box office
The Little Hours grossed a total of $1,647,175. The film opened in two theaters on its opening weekend and grossed $61,560.

Critical reception
The Little Hours received positive reviews from film critics. It holds a 78% approval rating on review aggregator website Rotten Tomatoes, based on 128 reviews, with a weighted average of 6.5/10. The website's critical consensus reads: "The Little Hours gets plenty of goofy mileage out of its gifted ensemble, anchoring its ribald laughs in a period comedy with some surprisingly timely subtext." On Metacritic, the film holds a rating of 69 out of 100, based on 29 critics, indicating "generally favorable reviews".

References

External links
 
 
 

2017 films
2017 black comedy films
American independent films
Films directed by Jeff Baena
Films scored by Dan Romer
Films set in the 14th century
Nuns in fiction
The Decameron
Films about Catholic nuns
Films about sexual repression
Films set in Italy
Films based on works by Giovanni Boccaccio
Nunsploitation films
American black comedy films
2017 independent films
2010s English-language films
2010s American films